Eupithecia decussata is a moth in the family Geometridae. It was described by Claude Herbulot in 1997. It is found in the Republic of Congo.

References

Moths described in 1997
decussata
Moths of Africa